Nyantain Bayaraa (* 25. September 1991) is a Mongolian sport shooter, born in Ulaanbaatar. He competed at the 2012 Summer Olympics in the Men's 10 metre air rifle, men's 50 m rifle prone and men's 50 m rifle 3 positions, finishing in 23rd, 33rd and 40th position respectively.  He also competed at the 2014 and 2018 World Championships.

References

External links
 

Mongolian male sport shooters
Living people
Olympic shooters of Mongolia
Shooters at the 2012 Summer Olympics
Shooters at the 2014 Asian Games
Shooters at the 2018 Asian Games
Asian Games competitors for Mongolia

1991 births
People from Ulaanbaatar
21st-century Mongolian people